Église-Neuve-d'Issac is a commune in the Dordogne department in Nouvelle-Aquitaine in southwestern France.

The commune is located on the main road, D 709, between Bergerac and Mussidan.

Population

See also
Communes of the Dordogne department

References

Communes of Dordogne